Tropheops gracilior is a species of cichlid endemic to Lake Malawi where it lives in caves.

This species can reach a length of  TL.

References

gracilior
Fish of Lake Malawi
Cichlid fish of Africa
Fish described in 1935
Taxa named by Ethelwynn Trewavas
Taxonomy articles created by Polbot